Sir Hugh John Dyke Acland  (17 January 1904 – 26 January 1981) was a New Zealand politician of the National Party.

Early life
Acland was born in 1904 in Christchurch.  His parents were Sir Hugh Acland (1874–1956), a prominent surgeon in New Zealand, and Evelyn Mary Acland (née Ovans). His great-grandfather was Sir Thomas Dyke Acland, 10th Baronet. His brother-in-law was Sir John Ormond. His cousin was Felicity Lusk, headmistress. He was educated at Waihi School and Christ's College.

When riding his motorbike, Acland was hit by a car on Christchurch's Park Terrace in October 1924. He suffered a complex break of his leg just above the ankle, and spent over a month in bed at his parents’ house, Chippenham Lodge. With Frederick Wilding  as his lawyer, he won a substantial compensation from the driver, and used the money to have his leg reset in England, where he spent one year. Despite this, he limped for the rest of his life.

On 12 June 1935, Acland married Katherine "Kit" Wilder Ormond, daughter of John Davies Ormond Jr. and granddaughter of John Davies Ormond Sr. The wedding was held at St Mary's Church at Waipukurau.

He worked on farms in South Canterbury, was a stockman and a driver. He worked in various jobs in Australia for some time before taking on the management of Mount Peel Station, which had been established by his grandfather, John Acland. Due to his leg injury, he was rejected by the army.

Political career

He was confirmed in the 1943 general election.

Acland gained prominence in the wool industry. He chaired the New Zealand Wool Board (1960–1972) and was vice-president of the International Wool Secretariat. He was appointed a Knight Commander of the Order of the British Empire in the 1968 Queen's Birthday Honours, for services to the wool industry. He died on 27 January 1981.

Notes

References

New Zealand National Party MPs
1904 births
1981 deaths
Jack
Members of the New Zealand House of Representatives
New Zealand MPs for South Island electorates
Unsuccessful candidates in the 1946 New Zealand general election
New Zealand justices of the peace
New Zealand Knights Commander of the Order of the British Empire
People from Christchurch
People educated at Christ's College, Christchurch
20th-century New Zealand politicians
Ormond family
Harper family